Robin Attfield, MA (Oxon), PhD (Wales) is a Professor of Philosophy at Cardiff University since 1992.

Robin Attfield read Greats (Literae Humaniores) at Christ Church and theology at Regent's Park College, Oxford.

He is a member of the Council of the Royal Institute of Philosophy; a co-opted member of the executive committee of the British Philosophical Association; Chair of the Cardiff Branch of the Royal Institute of Philosophy and a member of the UNESCO working party on environmental ethics.

Publications
Books authored or edited by Robin Attfield include:
 Environmental Ethics: An Overview for the Twenty-First Century (Polity-Blackwell, 2003; 2nd Ed 2014-03-31) 
 Creation, Evolution and Meaning (Ashgate, 2006).
 Environmental Ethics and Global Sustainability, in Henk A.M.J. ten Have (ed.), Environmental Ethics and International Policy, Paris: UNESCO, 2006, 69–87, ;  
 Robin Attfield, God and The Secular: A Philosophical Assessment of Secular Reasoning from Bacon to Kant (2nd edn.), Aldershot: Gregg Revivals and Brookfield, VT: Ashgate, 1993, pp. 231, .
 Robin Attfield, The Ethics of Environmental Concern, (2nd. edn., 31 Aug. 1991) , translated into Korean by Seunghoe Koo, Seoul: Earth Love Publications, 1997, pp. 377, .
 Robin Attfield, A Theory of Value and Obligation, London, Sydney, New York: Croom Helm, 1987, pp. x + 262, .
 Robin Attfield and Katharine Dell (eds.), Values, Conflict and the Environment (Report of the environmental ethics interdisciplinary Working Party of the Ian Ramsey Centre, St. Cross College, Oxford), 2nd edn., Aldershot: Avebury, and Brookfield, VT: Ashgate, 1996, pp. xii + 174; .
 Robin Attfield and Barry Wilkins (eds.), International Justice and the Third World: Essays in the Philosophy of Development, London and New York: Routledge, 1992, pp. ix + 207,  (hb);  (pb). 
 Robin Attfield, Environmental Philosophy: Principles and Prospects, Aldershot: Avebury and Brookfield, VT: Ashgate, 1994(i), pp.viii + 262; .
 Robin Attfield and Andrew Belsey (eds.), Philosophy and the Natural Environment (also published as Royal Institute of Philosophy Supplement 36), Cambridge: Cambridge University Press, 1994(ii), pp. vi + 250, .
 Robin Attfield, Value, Obligation and Meta-Ethics, Amsterdam and Atlanta: Rodopi, 1995, pp. xv + 319;  (hb);  (pb).
 Robin Attfield, The Ethics of the Global Environment, Edinburgh: Edinburgh University Press, 1999, in the World Ethics Series edited by Nigel Dower, pp. viii + 232, ; also West Lafayette, IN: Purdue University Press, 1999, .
 Robin Attfield, Environmental Ethics: An Overview for the Twenty-First Century, Polity Press, Cambridge, and Blackwell, Malden, MA, 2003, pp. xii + 232.  (hb);  (pb); (2nd Edn)	14-Mar-2014 
(Also an e-book)
 Robin Attfield (ed.), The Ethics of the Environment, Farnham, UK and Burlington, VT: Ashgate, 2008, pp. xxx + 620, .
 Robin Attfield, Ethics: An Overview, London and New York: Continuum/Bloomsbury, 2012, pp. xii + 262.  (hb);  (pb). (Also an e-book)
 Editors: Robin Attfield, Lucas Andrianos, Jan-Willem Sneep, Guillermo KerberSustainable Alternatives for Poverty Reduction and Eco-Justice: Volume 1; 1 Dec 2014 (hb); 
 Robin Attfield: Every Teacher a Leader: Developing and Realizing Potential 15 Dec 2007 (pb); 
 Ed. Robin Attfield and Barry Wilkins International Justice and the Third World: Studies in the Philosophy of Development; 1 Nov 1992; (pb) 
 Robin Attfield: Environmental Ethics: A Very Short Introduction; 13 Dec 2018 (pb) 
 Robin Attfield: Wonder, Value and God: 18 Sep 2018; (pb)

References 

Academics of Cardiff University
Alumni of Cardiff University
Alumni of Christ Church, Oxford
Alumni of Regent's Park College, Oxford
Environmental ethicists
Year of birth missing (living people)
Living people
Place of birth missing (living people)